Fiji was hit by serious flooding in January 2012.

Meteorological synopsis
On January 19 the Fiji Meteorological Service's RSMC Nadi reported that Tropical Disturbance 06F, had developed along an active trough of low pressure to the north of Fiji. Over the next couple of days, the disturbance moved towards the south before it developed into a tropical depression and moved across Vanua Levu during January 21. Once over Vanua Levu the depression remained stationary over central parts of the country causing widespread heavy rainfall and strong winds over Fiji's Northern and Eastern divisions until January 25, when it weakened and started to move away to the southeast.

Preparations and impact
Heavy rains from the middle of the month caused unprecedented flooding and landslides, which led to a state of emergency being declared late in the month. The flooding was worst in the western part of the main island of Viti Levu.

Eight people were reported to have died in the floods, most of them on the main island, and thousands of people were displaced, with some 3,500 people placed in temporary shelters. Power and water supplies were cut to many areas, and roads were washed away. Further damage was caused to crops and to other infrastructure.

The Disaster Management Office declared the areas of Nadi and Lautoka (the country's second and third cities), Ba, Sigatoka, and Rakiraki to be the worst affected, all of which were declared to be in a state of disaster.

It is likely that flood damage was exacerbated by changes in land use which have seen increases in the intensity of water run-off.

Fijian Red Cross agencies have been distributing emergency relief items to those affected, and their Australia and New Zealand counterparts have been helping in fundraising and advisory capacities, with Australian water and sanitation specialists active in helping to provide clean water supplies.

See also
2011-12 South Pacific cyclone season

References

Floods
Fiji
January 2012 events in Oceania
Floods in Fiji
2012 in Fiji
2012 disasters in Fiji
 
[[Category:2012 disasters in Fiji]